Clint Session (born September 22, 1984) is a former American football linebacker who played for six seasons in the National Football League. He played college football at Pittsburgh and was drafted by the Indianapolis Colts in the fourth round of the 2007 NFL Draft.

Session has also been a member of the Jacksonville Jaguars.

Early years
Session attended Blanche Ely High School in Pompano Beach, Florida and was an honor student and a letterman in football and track & field. In football, he was a four-year letterman and as a senior, he led his team to the Florida State Title. He was a first-team All-Broward County Athletic Association selection, a first-team All-Broward County selection, a first-team Class 5A All-Florida selection, and an All-Southwest Region selection by PrepStar.

College career
A team captain and two-year starter for the Pittsburgh Panthers, Session finished his college career with 259 tackles, 2.5 sacks, seven forced fumbles, and three interceptions.

Professional career

Indianapolis Colts
Session was drafted by the Indianapolis Colts in the fourth round of the 2007 NFL Draft. After spending his rookie season as a backup, he became a starter during his second season. He started 15 of 16 games for the Colts at outside linebacker, recording 94 tackles.

Jacksonville Jaguars
On July 28, 2011, Session signed a 5-year, $30 million contract with the Jacksonville Jaguars.

In November 2011, Session suffered multiple concussions in a game against the Cleveland Browns. The following week, he was placed on the injured reserve list, ending his season.

Session had not recovered at the beginning of the 2012 season and was placed on the physically unable to perform (PUP) list. He was waived on December 4, 2012.

Post football career
Clinton Session owns and operates "Raw Juice" - a smoothie bar in Northeast Indianapolis.

In mid-2015, press reports indicated Session was being sued to provide child support payments to his blind three-year-old daughter.

References

External links
Jacksonville Jaguars bio

1984 births
Living people
People from Pompano Beach, Florida
Players of American football from Florida
American football linebackers
Blanche Ely High School alumni
Pittsburgh Panthers football players
Indianapolis Colts players
Jacksonville Jaguars players
Sportspeople from Broward County, Florida